Sound of Cherona is the debut and only studio album by German pop group Cherona.

Track listing

Charts

References 

2009 debut albums
Cherona albums